The Graz tramway network is a network of tramways forming an important part of the public transport system in Graz, which is both the capital city of the federal state of Styria, Austria, and the second largest city in Austria.

In operation since 1878, the network presently has six daytime lines, and five evening and Sunday lines. , the Graz tram network ran on an almost  of route, and served 53.56 million passengers.  It is operated by the Graz Linien division of Holding Graz, the city owned utility company who also operate the city's bus network and the Schlossbergbahn funicular railway. The trams form part of the styrian integrated fare system which covers all modes of public transport in Graz and Styria.

The Tramway Museum Graz, at the terminus of line 1 in Mariatrost, holds many exhibits relating to the system.

History

The first trams to run in Graz were horse trams in private ownership, with service commencing in 1878. The lines were electrified from 1899. In 1939, the tram network was acquired by the city.

In 1941, the narrow gauge electric railway that had linked Graz with the suburb of Mariatrost since 1898, was converted to standard gauge and became part of the tram network. The resulting long outer section of tram route 1 still retains many light railway features, with its off-street routing and long stretches of single track.

The Graz tram network reached a peak in 1950. Growing car ownership, and the growth of residential areas in outer reaches of the city not served by the trams, lead to a fall in tram usage and eventually, after 1950, the closure of several tram routes. The city introduced trolleybuses in 1941 to serve the outer areas of the city, but these were replaced by motor buses by 1967.

In the 1990s, with the city's narrow central streets proving ill-suited to large quantities of private car traffic, the city adopted a policy of improving and expanding public transport, with modernisation and extension of the tramway. The area around Jakominiplatz was developed as the main tram and city bus interchange from 1995, whilst extensions to Puntigam, Liebenau/Murpark and St Peter followed in 2006 and 2007.

These were the city's first 100% low-floor trams, although the concept was introduced in 1999 by the fitting of new low-floor centre sections to 12 existing trams.

In 2007, Graz ordered 45 Stadler Variobahn trams for delivery between 2009 and 2015. These vehicles proved controversial, with complaints over noise and vibration levels. Initially confined to the north–south axis lines 4 and 5, the trams started operating on the east–west axis in 2013, after modifications and imposition of a speed limit.

In 2012, new tram tunnels were built to serve the city's main railway station (Graz Hauptbahnhof), which was previously the terminus of two tram lines and some distance from the main westbound tram route. Trams on the main line now stop in a new subsurface tram station in the station forecourt area. This allows the station to be served by four of the city's six lines.

In 2016 a new extension of line 7 in order to serve the new medical campus of the University of Graz in Stiftingtalstraße has been constructed and opened to the public on 11 September 2016. The line was extended by one stop from the previous terminus at St. Leonhard.

Operation

Route network 
The following services operate during the day on Mondays to Saturdays:
 Line 1: Eggenberg/UKH – Hauptbahnhof – Jakominiplatz – Mariatrost
 Line 3: Andritz – Jakominiplatz – Krenngasse
 Line 4: Reininghaus – Hauptbahnhof – Jakominiplatz – Liebenau/Murpark
 Line 5: Andritz – Jakominiplatz – Puntigam
 Line 6: Smart City/Peter-Tunner-Gasse/tim – Hauptbahnhof – Jakominiplatz – St. Peter
 Line 7: Wetzelsdorf – Hauptbahnhof – Jakominiplatz –  LKH Med Uni/Klinikum Nord

The following services operate in the evenings and on Sundays:
 Lines 1, 4, 5, 6 and 7: as above
 Line 23: Krenngasse – Jakominiplatz

Infrastructure 

Graz's tram network is built to standard gauge and is electrified using overhead line at 600 V DC. Most of the track is at grade, with the exception of the subsurface tram stop, with linking tunnels, at the main railway station, and a short tunnel just before the southern terminus of line 5.

With the exception of the short tunnelled sections, and the former light railway section of line 1, all of the system is street based, with varying degrees of segregation. As the trams are single-ended, with doors on only one side, all terminal locations are equipped with turning loops, and all tram stops are to the nearside of the tram.

Tram fleet 
, the Graz tramway network's fleet was:

Tickets and fares 
The Graz tramway network is entirely within zone 101 of the Verbund Linie, an integrated tariff for public transport throughout Styria. Zone 101 tickets are valid on all trams, and all city buses with single or double digit route numbers. They are also valid on regional buses, which have three digit route numbers, and trains, but only within the boundary of the zone.

Tickets are available for different periods of validity, including one hour, 24 hours, a week, a month or a year, and allow unlimited changes of vehicle within the validity period. Tickets can be purchased from ticket machines on board the trams or at the major stops, from tobacconists, or from a central office. They are also available by SMS text message or via a smartphone app.

Aimed at visitors to the city, there is also a three-day ticket which allows unlimited travel within the city for three days, as well as giving reduced admission charges at selected attractions. The ticket is available at hotels and other accommodation, at the city tourist information office, at ticket sale counters at the Schloßbergbahn funicular, and at Graz Airport.

Future
With the introduction of the full set of Variobahn trams, many of Graz's older high-floor trams will be retired. It is also planned to lengthen the new Variobahn trams by adding 2 further sections to the trams.

There are plans for a number of extensions to existing lines plus the building of 2 new lines.

On February 5, 2018, the co-financing of a comprehensive expansion program between the city and - for the first time - Land Steiermark was signed. By 2023, 117 million euros are to be spent on the construction and expansion of 6 routes. Third-party funding by the federal government is sought.

Reininghaus. 1.8 km new, with pedestrian and bicycle path, 44.1 million euros, 2019-2021
Unbundling Herrengasse. via Belgiergasse, Vorbeckgasse to Annenstraße, about 1 km new, 27 million euros, 2021-2023
Connection Smart-City Waagner-Biro-Straße; from Asperngasse (Ri N) to Peter-Tunner-Gasse, 1.1 km new, 22.4 million euros, 2020/2021
Second track line 5: Central cemetery to Brauquartier Puntigam, x km, 15.3 million euros, 2022/2023
Second track line 1: Hilmteich to Mariagrün, y km, 6.3 million euros, until 2023
Second track line 1: Mariagrün to Mariatrost partially, z km, 2.3 million euros, until 2019
Open and in preparation is still the project of the leadership of a new line after Don Bosco (Nahverkehrsknoten).

See also

List of town tramway systems

References

External links

Holding Graz Linien web site 
Track plan of the Graz tram system
gallery of Graz trams

Graz
Transport in Graz
600 V DC railway electrification
Graz